was a town located in Mino District, Shimane Prefecture, Japan.

As of 2003, the town had an estimated population of 2,615 and a density of 19.72 persons per km2. The total area was 132.64 km2.

On November 1, 2004, Mito, along with the town of Hikimi (also from Mino District), was merged into the expanded city of Masuda.

Dissolved municipalities of Shimane Prefecture